The 2007 ICC World Cricket League Division One was a One Day International cricket tournament played from 29 January 2007 to 7 February 2007 in Nairobi, Kenya. Division One, which is the successor to the now defunct ICC 6 Nations Challenge, is the highest tier of the World Cricket League, and is effectively the second level of cricket below the 10 Test-playing nations. This tournament served as an important warm-up for the 2007 Cricket World Cup that took place in the West Indies in March 2007. The tournament featured the six Associate members in the 2007 Cricket World Cup, who qualified for the Cricket World Cup as hosts and through the 2005 ICC Trophy.

Games were played at Nairobi Gymkhana Club, Ruaraka Sports Club and Jaffery Sports Club, all located in Nairobi.

Points table

Scotland and Kenya qualified for the final which was won by Kenya. Both qualified for the 2007 Twenty20 Cricket World Championship to be held in South Africa in September.

Group stage
1st Match

2nd Match

3rd Match

4th Match

5th Match

6th Match

7th Match

8th Match

9th Match

10th Match

11th Match

12th Match

13th Match

14th Match

15th Match

Final

Statistics

Player of the Tournament was A Bagai for his 345 runs, and his performance as wicket-keeper for Canada: 4 catches and 1 stumping.

See also

World Cricket League
ICC Six Nations Challenge

References

External links
 Tournament home at ESPNcricinfo
World Cricket League structure

League Division 1 2007
2007 Division One
Kenyan cricket seasons from 2000–01
Sport in Nairobi
2007 ICC World Twenty20
2007 in Kenyan cricket